Nycterodina is a genus of leaf beetles in the subfamily Eumolpinae. It is known from South America.

Species
Subgenus Nycterodina Bechyné, 1951
 Nycterodina aciculata (Lefèvre, 1891)
 Nycterodina bahiensis (Lefèvre, 1891)
 Nycterodina bordoni Bechyné & Bechyné, 1969
 Nycterodina floralis Bechyné, 1953
 Nycterodina freyi Bechyné, 1955
 Nycterodina ignara Bechyné, 1952
 Nycterodina lanei Bechyné & Bechyné, 1964
 Nycterodina lilibetha Bechyné, 1955
 Nycterodina punctatostriata (Lefèvre, 1875)
 Nycterodina submucronata (Bechyné, 1950)
 Nycterodina thoracica (Jacoby, 1900)

Subgenus Nycterodinella Bechyné & Bechyné, 1969 (type species: Nycterodina callifera Bechyné & Bechyné, 1961)
 Nycterodina amazoniae Bechyné & Bechyné, 1961
 Nycterodina callifera Bechyné & Bechyné, 1961
 Nycterodina carinifera Bechyné & Bechyné, 1961
 Nycterodina immetallica Bechyné & Bechyné, 1961
 Nycterodina isabella Bechyné, 1953
 Nycterodina lamellifera Bechyné & Bechyné, 1961
 Nycterodina nigrita (Baly, 1878)
 Nycterodina subcostata (Jacoby, 1900)
 Nycterodina tincta Bechyné & Bechyné, 1961

Synonyms:
 Nycterodina aulica (Lefèvre, 1884): synonym of Nycterodina punctatostriata (Lefèvre, 1875)
 Nycterodina nigrita (Weise, 1921) (preoccupied by N. nigrita (Baly, 1878)): renamed to Nycterodina amazoniae Bechyné & Bechyné, 1961

References

Eumolpinae
Chrysomelidae genera
Beetles of South America